The following is a comprehensive discography of Arch Enemy, a Swedish melodic death metal band that formed in 1996. Its members were in bands such as Carcass, Armageddon, Carnage, Mercyful Fate, Spiritual Beggars, and Eucharist. It was founded by Carcass guitarist Michael Amott along with Johan Liiva, who were both originally from the influential death metal band Carnage. The band has released eleven studio albums, three live albums, three video albums, three compilation albums and three EPs. The band was originally fronted by Johan Liiva, who was replaced by German Angela Gossow as lead vocalist in 2000. Gossow left the band in March 2014 and was replaced by Canadian Alissa White-Gluz, while remaining as the group's manager.

Albums

Studio albums

Live albums

Compilation albums

Extended plays

Singles

Videos

Video albums

Music videos

References

Discographies of Swedish artists
Heavy metal group discographies